At the 1986 Goodwill Games, two different gymnastics disciplines were contested: artistic gymnastics and rhythmic gymnastics.

Artistic Gymnastics

Medalists

Rhythmic Gymnastics

Medalists

Details

Artistic Gymnastics

Men

Team All-Around

Individual All-Around

Floor

Pommel horse

Rings

Vault

Parallel bars

Horizontal bar

Women

Team All-Around

Individual All-Around

Vault

Uneven Bars

Balance Beam

Floor

Rhythmic Gymnastics

All-Around

Rope

Ball

Clubs

Ribbon

Medal summary

Overall

References 

1986 Goodwill Games
Gymnastics in Russia
1986 in gymnastics